CENTOS may refer to:
 CENTOS (charity), a Polish children's aid society
 CentOS, a Linux distribution
  CENTOS (Oldenburg Center for Sustainability Economics and Management), a center co-founded by Niko Paech

See also
 Cento (disambiguation)